Miss Grand Chile is a national female beauty pageant in Chile that has been held annually since 2016, founded by Boris Cabrera of Latin Scouting y CBC Producciones, aiming to select country representatives to compete in its parent international contest, Miss Grand International. In 2019, the pageant license was consigned to Keno Manzur, and subsequently transferred to Cristian Chanaca and Gabriel Alfonsino in 2021, Chanaca later withdrew from the director team in 2023.

Since first participation in 2014, the only one placement of Chile representative at Miss Grand International is top 20 finalists, obtained by "Francisca Lavandero" in 2019.

Background

History
Chile joined Miss Grand International for the first time in the 2014 edition in Bangkok, represented by 21-year-old model Karla Bovet Quidel, then absent for two years consecutively. Later in 2017, Latin Scouting y CBC Producciones – headed by Boris Cabrera – the organizer of the Reinas de Chile, had obtained the franchise and consequently ran the inaugural edition of the Miss Grand Chile contest at the Music Palace Event Center in Talca on September 22. In addition to crowning such the winner,  the Miss Supranational Chile 2017 title was also awarded to Konstanza Schmidt of Quillota. However, since the contest was not held in the following year, the licensee assigned María Flores, one of the 2017 finalists from  Concepción, to participate at the international event in Myanmar instead.

The pageant was not held in 2020 due to the COVID-19 pandemic caused the organizer to appoint the candidate to take part in the 2020 international edition in Thailand instead. Later in 2021, Manzur relinquished the franchise to Cristian Chanaca and Gabriel Alfonsino, who have been organizing the contest annually in Iquique since then.

Location and date

Titleholders

Winner gallery

National finalists
The following list is the national finalists of the Miss Grand Chile pageant, as well as the competition results.
Color keys
 Declared as the winner
 Ended as a runner-up (Top 3/4/5)
 Ended as a semifinalist (Top 6/10) 
 Did not participate

1st - 5th edition: assumed city representatives

References

External links

 

Beauty pageants in Chile
Recurring events established in 2017
2017 establishments in Chile
Chilean awards